Miguel Ángel Solares Chávez (born 29 September 1945) is a Mexican politician affiliated with the National Regeneration Movement. As of 1997 he served as Deputy of the LVII and LX Legislatures of the Mexican Congress representing the Federal District.

References

1945 births
Living people
Politicians from Mexico City
Party of the Democratic Revolution politicians
21st-century Mexican politicians
Deputies of the LX Legislature of Mexico
Members of the Chamber of Deputies (Mexico) for Mexico City